Gatka is a Sikh fencing performance art.
Gatka may also refer to:
Places in Poland
Gatka, Lower Silesian Voivodeship (south-west Poland)
Gatka, Mława County in Masovian Voivodeship (east-central Poland) 
Gatka, Pułtusk County in Masovian Voivodeship (east-central Poland)
Gatka, Bytów County in Pomeranian Voivodeship (east Poland)
Gatka, Słupsk County in Pomeranian Voivodeship (east Poland)

Surname
Tomasz Gatka (born 1974), Polish Olympic bobsledder

Others
Chatka gatka The original khalsa Sikh and Indian battlefield martial arts known as Shastar Vidiya.

See also
Gataka (disambiguation)